Bob Nickman is an American comedian, actor, television producer, and television writer.

As a television producer/writer, his credits include Mad About You, Freaks and Geeks, Danny, According to Jim, Big Day, Rita Rocks and Roseanne.

As an actor, he appeared in four episodes of Roseanne from 1994 to 1995, as well as guest starring in an episode of Designing Women in 1990, his acting debut. He also appeared in the films Shakes the Clown (1991) and Crossing the Bridge (1992).

He is a native of Cleveland, Ohio and performed stand-up comedy for much of the 1980s.

References

External links

American male film actors
American stand-up comedians
American male television actors
Television producers from Ohio
American television writers
American male television writers
Living people
Male actors from Cleveland
Year of birth missing (living people)
Comedians from Ohio
Screenwriters from Ohio